The arrondissement of Brest, sometimes referred to as greater Brest, or the greater Brest region, is an arrondissement of France in the Finistère department in the Brittany region. It has 77 communes.

Composition

The communes of the arrondissement of Brest, and their INSEE codes, are:

 Bohars (29011)
 Bourg-Blanc (29015)
 Brélès (29017)
 Brest (29019)
 Coat-Méal (29035)
 Le Conquet (29040)
 Daoulas (29043)
 Dirinon (29045)
 Le Drennec (29047)
 Le Folgoët (29055)
 La Forest-Landerneau (29056)
 Gouesnou (29061)
 Goulven (29064)
 Guilers (29069)
 Guipavas (29075)
 Guissény (29077)
 Hanvec (29078)
 Hôpital-Camfrout (29080)
 Île-Molène (29084)
 Irvillac (29086)
 Kerlouan (29091)
 Kernilis (29093)
 Kernouës (29094)
 Kersaint-Plabennec (29095)
 Lampaul-Plouarzel (29098)
 Lampaul-Ploudalmézeau (29099)
 Lanarvily (29100)
 Landéda (29101)
 Landerneau (29103)
 Landunvez (29109)
 Lanildut (29112)
 Lanneuffret (29116)
 Lannilis (29117)
 Lanrivoaré (29119)
 Lesneven (29124)
 Loc-Brévalaire (29126)
 Locmaria-Plouzané (29130)
 Logonna-Daoulas (29137)
 Loperhet (29140)
 La Martyre (29144)
 Milizac-Guipronvel (29076)
 Ouessant (29155)
 Pencran (29156)
 Plabennec (29160)
 Plouarzel (29177)
 Ploudalmézeau (29178)
 Ploudaniel (29179)
 Ploudiry (29180)
 Plouédern (29181)
 Plougastel-Daoulas (29189)
 Plougonvelin (29190)
 Plouguerneau (29195)
 Plouguin (29196)
 Plouider (29198)
 Ploumoguer (29201)
 Plounéour-Brignogan-Plages (29021)
 Plourin (29208)
 Plouvien (29209)
 Plouzané (29212)
 Porspoder (29221)
 Le Relecq-Kerhuon (29235)
 La Roche-Maurice (29237)
 Saint-Divy (29245)
 Saint-Eloy (29246)
 Saint-Frégant (29248)
 Saint-Méen (29255)
 Saint-Pabu (29257)
 Saint-Renan (29260)
 Saint-Thonan (29268)
 Saint-Urbain (29270)
 Trébabu (29282)
 Tréflévénez (29286)
 Trégarantec (29288)
 Tréglonou (29290)
 Le Tréhou (29294)
 Trémaouézan (29295)
 Tréouergat (29299)

History

The arrondissement of Brest was created in 1800. At the January 2017 reorganisation of the arrondissements of Finistère, it lost one commune to the arrondissement of Morlaix.

As a result of the reorganisation of the cantons of France which came into effect in 2015, the borders of the cantons are no longer related to the borders of the arrondissements. The cantons of the arrondissement of Brest were, as of January 2015:

 Brest-Bellevue
 Brest-Cavale-Blanche-Bohars-Guilers
 Brest-Centre
 Brest-Kerichen
 Brest-Lambezellec
 Brest-L'Hermitage-Gouesnou
 Brest-Plouzané
 Brest-Recouvrance
 Brest-Saint-Marc
 Brest-Saint-Pierre
 Daoulas
 Guipavas
 Landerneau
 Lannilis
 Lesneven
 Ouessant
 Plabennec
 Ploudalmézeau
 Ploudiry
 Saint-Renan

References

Geography of Brest, France
Brest